The 15th West Virginia Infantry Regiment was an infantry regiment that served in the Union Army during the American Civil War.

Service
The 15th West Virginia Infantry Regiment was organized at Wheeling in western Virginia between August and October 1862, and was mustered out on June 14, 1865.

Casualties
The 15th West Virginia Infantry Regiment suffered 3 officers and 50 enlisted men killed in battle or died from wounds, and 1 officer and 99 enlisted men dead from disease for a total of 153 fatalities.

Commanders
 Colonel Maxwell McCaslin, September 6, 1862 - September 7, 1864
 Colonel Milton Wells

References

The Civil War Archive

See also
West Virginia Units in the Civil War
West Virginia in the Civil War

Units and formations of the Union Army from West Virginia
1862 establishments in Virginia
Military units and formations established in 1862
Military units and formations disestablished in 1865